New Writings in SF 20 is an anthology of science fiction short stories edited by John Carnell, the twentieth volume in a series of thirty, of which he edited the first twenty-one. It was first published in hardcover by Dennis Dobson in 1972, followed by a paperback edition issued by Corgi under the slightly variant title New Writings in SF -- 20 the same year.

The book collects six novelettes and short stories by various science fiction authors, with a foreword by Carnell.

Contents
"Foreword" (John Carnell)
"Conversational Mode" (Grahame Leman)
"Which Way Do I Go For Jericho?" (Colin Kapp)
"Microcosm" (Robert P. Holdstock)
"Cainn" (H. A. Hargreaves)
"Canary" (Dan Morgan)
"Oh, Valinda!" (Michael G. Coney)

Notes

1972 books
20